Below is the list of populated places in Bolu Province, Turkey by the districts. In the following lists first place in each list is the administrative center of the district.

Bolu 
 Bolu
 Afşar, Bolu
 Ağaçcılar, Bolu
 Ahmetler, Bolu
 Akçaalan, Bolu
 Alıçören, Bolu
 Aşağıçamlı, Bolu
 Aşağıkuzören, Bolu
 Avdan, Bolu
 Aydıncık, Bolu
 Bağışlar, Bolu
 Bahçeköy, Bolu
 Bakırlı, Bolu
 Baltalı, Bolu
 Banaz, Bolu
 Belkaraağaç, Bolu
 Berk, Bolu
 Bozarmut, Bolu
 Bünüş, Bolu
 Bürnük, Bolu
 Çampınar, Bolu
 Çamyayla, Bolu
 Çanakçılar, Bolu
 Çatakören, Bolu
 Çaygökpınar, Bolu
 Çayırköy, Bolu
 Çepni, Bolu
 Çobankaya, Bolu
 Çömlekçiler, Bolu
 Çukurören, Bolu
 Değirmenbeli, Bolu
 Değirmenderesi, Bolu
 Demirciler, Bolu
 Dereceören, Bolu
 Doğancı, Bolu
 Elmalık, Bolu
 Ericek, Bolu
 Fasıl, Bolu
 Gökpınar, Bolu
 Gölcük, Bolu
 Gölköy, Bolu
 Gövem, Bolu
 Güneyfelekettin, Bolu
 Hamzabey, Bolu
 Hıdırşeyhler, Bolu
 Ilıcakınık, Bolu
 Işıklar, Bolu
 Kandamış, Bolu
 Karacasu, Bolu
 Karaköy, Bolu
 Karamanlar, Bolu
 Karca, Bolu
 Ketenler, Bolu
 Kındıra, Bolu
 Kırha, Bolu
 Kızılağıl, Bolu
 Kolköy, Bolu
 Kozlu, Bolu
 Köprücüler, Bolu
 Kuzfındık, Bolu
 Kuzörendağlı, Bolu
 Kuzörenemirler, Bolu
 Küplüce, Bolu
 Kürkçüler, Bolu
 Merkeşler, Bolu
 Mesciçele, Bolu
 Mesciler, Bolu
 Muratlar, Bolu
 Musluklar, Bolu
 Müstakimler, Bolu
 Nuhlar, Bolu
 Oğulduruk, Bolu
 Okçular, Bolu
 Ömerler, Bolu
 Örencik, Bolu
 Pelitcik, Bolu
 Pirahmetler, Bolu
 Piroğlu, Bolu
 Rüzgarlar, Bolu
 Saççılar, Bolu
 Saraycık, Bolu
 Sazakkınık, Bolu
 Sazakşeyhler, Bolu
 Sebenardı, Bolu
 Semerciler, Bolu
 Sultan, Bolu
 Sultanbey, Bolu
 Susuzkınık, Bolu
 Tarakçı, Bolu
 Taşçılar, Bolu
 Taşoluk, Bolu
 Tatlar, Bolu
 Tekkedere, Bolu
 Tetemeçele, Bolu
 Tokmaklar, Bolu
 Topardıç, Bolu
 Ulumescit, Bolu
 Vakıfgeçitveren, Bolu
 Yakabayat, Bolu
 Yakuplar, Bolu
 Yayladınlar, Bolu
 Yazıören, Bolu
 Yeniakçakavak, Bolu
 Yenicepınar, Bolu
 Yeniçaydurt, Bolu
 Yenigeçitveren, Bolu
 Yenigüney, Bolu
 Yeniköy, Bolu
 Yenipelitcik, Bolu
 Yenisefa, Bolu
 Yeşilçele, Bolu
 Yeşilköy, Bolu
 Yolçatı, Bolu
 Yukarıçamlı, Bolu
 Yumrukaya, Bolu
 Yuva, Bolu

Dörtdivan 

 Dörtdivan
 Adaköy, Dörtdivan
 Aşağıdüğer, Dörtdivan
 Aşağısayık, Dörtdivan
 Bünüş, Dörtdivan
 Cemaller, Dörtdivan
 Çalköy, Dörtdivan
 Çardak, Dörtdivan
 Çetikören, Dörtdivan
 Doğancılar, Dörtdivan
 Dülger, Dörtdivan
 Göbüler, Dörtdivan
 Gücükler, Dörtdivan
 Kılıçlar, Dörtdivan
 Kuruca, Dörtdivan
 Ortaköy, Dörtdivan
 Ömerpaşalar, Dörtdivan
 Seyitaliler, Dörtdivan
 Sorkun, Dörtdivan
 Süleler, Dörtdivan
 Yağbaşlar, Dörtdivan
 Yalacık, Dörtdivan
 Yayalar, Dörtdivan
 Yukarıdüğer, Dörtdivan
 Yukarısayık, Dörtdivan

Gerede 

 Gerede
 Afşartarakçı, Gerede
 Ağızörengüney, Gerede
 Ahmetler, Gerede
 Akbaş, Gerede
 Akçabey, Gerede
 Akçaşehir, Gerede
 Aktaş, Gerede
 Aktaşkurtlar, Gerede
 Asmaca, Gerede
 Aşağıovacık, Gerede
 Aşağıörenbaşı, Gerede
 Aydınlar, Gerede
 Bahçedere, Gerede
 Balcılar, Gerede
 Beşkonak, Gerede
 Birinciafşar, Gerede
 Bünüş, Gerede
 Çağış, Gerede
 Çalaman, Gerede
 Çalışlar, Gerede
 Çayören, Gerede
 Çayörengüney, Gerede
 Çoğullu, Gerede
 Çukurca, Gerede
 Dağkara, Gerede
 Danişmentler, Gerede
 Davutbeyli, Gerede
 Demircisopran, Gerede
 Demirler, Gerede
 Dikmen, Gerede
 Dursunfakı, Gerede
 Elören, Gerede
 Enseliler, Gerede
 Ertuğrulköy, Gerede
 Eymür, Gerede
 Geçitler, Gerede
 Göynükören, Gerede
 Güneydemirciler, Gerede
 Hacılar, Gerede
 Halaçlar, Gerede
 Hasanlar, Gerede
 Havullu, Gerede
 Ibrıcak, Gerede
 İkinciafşar, Gerede
 İmamlar, Gerede
 İnköy, Gerede
 Kalaç, Gerede
 Kapaklı, Gerede
 Karacadağ, Gerede
 Karacadağdemirciler, Gerede
 Karapazar, Gerede
 Kavacık, Gerede
 Kayıkiraz, Gerede
 Kayısopran, Gerede
 Kazanlar, Gerede
 Koçumlar, Gerede
 Kösreli, Gerede
 Külef, Gerede
 Kürkçüler, Gerede
 Macarlar, Gerede
 Mangallar, Gerede
 Mircekiraz, Gerede
 Mukamlar, Gerede
 Muratfakılar, Gerede
 Mürdükler, Gerede
 Nuhören, Gerede
 Ortaca, Gerede
 Örencik, Gerede
 Salur, Gerede
 Samat, Gerede
 Sapanlıurgancılar, Gerede
 Sarıoğlu, Gerede
 Sipahiler, Gerede
 Sofular, Gerede
 Sungurlar, Gerede
 Süllertoklar, Gerede
 Tatlar, Gerede
 Ulaşlar, Gerede
 Ümitköy, Gerede
 Yağdaş, Gerede
 Yakaboy, Gerede
 Yakakaya, Gerede
 Yazıkara, Gerede
 Yazıköy, Gerede
 Yelkenler, Gerede
 Yenecik, Gerede
 Yeniyapar, Gerede
 Yeşilvadi, Gerede
 Yukarıovacık, Gerede
 Yukarıörenbaşı, Gerede
 Yunuslar, Gerede
 Zeyneller, Gerede

Göynük 

 Göynük
 Ahmetbeyler, Göynük
 Akçaalan, Göynük
 Aksaklar, Göynük
 Alanköy, Göynük
 Arıkçayırı, Göynük
 Arızlar, Göynük
 Aşağıkınık, Göynük
 Bayındır, Göynük
 Bekirfakılar, Göynük
 Boyacılar, Göynük
 Bozcaarmut, Göynük
 Bölücekova, Göynük
 Bulanık, Göynük
 Ceylanlı, Göynük
 Çamlıca, Göynük
 Çapar, Göynük
 Çatacık, Göynük
 Çayköy, Göynük
 Çaylakköy, Göynük
 Çubukköy, Göynük
 Dağhacılar, Göynük
 Dağşeyhleri, Göynük
 Dedeler, Göynük
 Değirmenözü, Göynük
 Demirhanlar, Göynük
 Ekinciler, Göynük
 Gerişler, Göynük
 Gökçesaray, Göynük
 Güneyçalıca, Göynük
 Gürpınar, Göynük
 Hacımahmut, Göynük
 Hasanlar, Göynük
 Hilaller, Göynük
 Himmetoğlu, Göynük
 Hisarözü, Göynük
 İbrahimözü, Göynük
 Karaaliler, Göynük
 Karaardıç, Göynük
 Karacalar, Göynük
 Kaşıkçışeyhler, Göynük
 Kayabaşı, Göynük
 Kayalıdere, Göynük
 Kılavuzlar, Göynük
 Kızılkuyu, Göynük
 Kilciler, Göynük
 Kozcağız, Göynük
 Köybaşı, Göynük
 Kumcuk, Göynük
 Kuyupınar, Göynük
 Kürnüç, Göynük
 Memeceler, Göynük
 Mustanlar, Göynük
 Narzanlar, Göynük
 Örencik, Göynük
 Pelitcik, Göynük
 Sarıcalar, Göynük
 Sarılar, Göynük
 Soğukçam, Göynük
 Susuz, Göynük
 Sünnet, Göynük
 Tekirler, Göynük
 Tepebaşı, Göynük
 Umurlar, Göynük
 Yeniköy, Göynük
 Yeşilyazı, Göynük
 Yukarıkınık, Göynük

Kıbrıscık 

 Kıbrıscık
 Alanhimmetler, Kıbrıscık
 Alemdar, Kıbrıscık
 Balı, Kıbrıscık
 Belen, Kıbrıscık
 Borucak, Kıbrıscık
 Bölücekkaya, Kıbrıscık
 Çökeler, Kıbrıscık
 Deveci, Kıbrıscık
 Deveören, Kıbrıscık
 Dokumacılar, Kıbrıscık
 Geriş, Kıbrıscık
 Karacaören, Kıbrıscık
 Karaköy, Kıbrıscık
 Kılkara, Kıbrıscık
 Kızılcaören, Kıbrıscık
 Kökez, Kıbrıscık
 Köseler, Kıbrıscık
 Kuzca, Kıbrıscık
 Nadas, Kıbrıscık
 Sarıkaya, Kıbrıscık
 Taşlık, Kıbrıscık
 Yazıca, Kıbrıscık

Mengen 

 Mengen
 Afşar, Mengen
 Ağacalar, Mengen
 Ağalar, Mengen
 Akçakoca, Mengen
 Akören, Mengen
 Aktepe, Mengen
 Alibeyler, Mengen
 Arak, Mengen
 Babahızır, Mengen
 Banaz, Mengen
 Başyellice, Mengen
 Bölükören, Mengen
 Bürnük, Mengen
 Çayköy, Mengen
 Çırdak, Mengen
 Çorakkadirler, Mengen
 Çorakmıtırlar, Mengen
 Çubuk, Mengen
 Çukurca, Mengen
 Demirciler, Mengen
 Dereköy, Mengen
 Düzağaç, Mengen
 Düzköy, Mengen
 Elemen, Mengen
 Emirler, Mengen
 Gökçesu, Mengen
 Gözecik, Mengen
 Güneygökçesu, Mengen
 Hacıahmetler, Mengen
 Hayranlar, Mengen
 İlyaslar, Mengen
 Kadılar, Mengen
 Kadısusuz, Mengen
 Karacalar, Mengen
 Karaishak, Mengen
 Karakaya, Mengen
 Karaşeyhler, Mengen
 Kavacık, Mengen
 Kayabaşı, Mengen
 Kayabükü, Mengen
 Kayışlar, Mengen
 Kıyaslar, Mengen
 Konak, Mengen
 Köprübaşı, Mengen
 Kuzgöl, Mengen
 Küçükkuz, Mengen
 Mamatlar, Mengen
 Nazırlar, Mengen
 Pazarköy, Mengen
 Rüknettin, Mengen
 Sarıkadılar, Mengen
 Sazlar, Mengen
 Şahbazlar, Mengen
 Teberikler, Mengen
 Turna, Mengen
 Yellicedemirciler, Mengen
 Yumrutaş, Mengen

Mudurnu 

 Mudurnu
 Akyokuş, Mudurnu
 Alpagut, Mudurnu
 Avdullar, Mudurnu
 Bekdemirler, Mudurnu
 Beyderesi, Mudurnu
 Bostancılar, Mudurnu
 Bulanık, Mudurnu
 Cuma, Mudurnu
 Çağşak, Mudurnu
 Çamurluk, Mudurnu
 Çamyurdu, Mudurnu
 Çavuşderesi, Mudurnu
 Çepni, Mudurnu
 Çevreli, Mudurnu
 Dağyolu, Mudurnu
 Dedeler, Mudurnu
 Delice, Mudurnu
 Dereçetinören, Mudurnu
 Dereköy, Mudurnu
 Dodurga, Mudurnu
 Dolayüz, Mudurnu
 Ekinören, Mudurnu
 Elmacıkdere, Mudurnu
 Esenkaya, Mudurnu
 Ferüz, Mudurnu
 Fındıcak, Mudurnu
 Gelinözü, Mudurnu
 Gökören, Mudurnu
 Gölcük, Mudurnu
 Göllüören, Mudurnu
 Göncek, Mudurnu
 Gürçam, Mudurnu
 Güveytepe, Mudurnu
 Hacıhalimler, Mudurnu
 Hacımusalar, Mudurnu
 Hüsamettindere, Mudurnu
 Ilıca, Mudurnu
 İğneciler, Mudurnu
 Kacık, Mudurnu
 Karacasumandıra, Mudurnu
 Karamurat, Mudurnu
 Karapınarkavağı, Mudurnu
 Karataş, Mudurnu
 Karşıköy, Mudurnu
 Kavallar, Mudurnu
 Keçikıran, Mudurnu
 Kilözü, Mudurnu
 Kovucak, Mudurnu
 Kurtlar, Mudurnu
 Mangırlar, Mudurnu
 Munduşlar, Mudurnu
 Ordular, Mudurnu
 Ormanpınar, Mudurnu
 Ortaköy, Mudurnu
 Örencik, Mudurnu
 Pelitözü, Mudurnu
 Samat, Mudurnu
 Samsaçavuş, Mudurnu
 Sarıyar, Mudurnu
 Sarpıncık, Mudurnu
 Sırçalı, Mudurnu
 Sürmeli, Mudurnu
 Taşcılar, Mudurnu
 Taşkesti, Mudurnu
 Tavşansuyu, Mudurnu
 Tımaraktaş, Mudurnu
 Tosunlar, Mudurnu
 Uğurlualan, Mudurnu
 Uzunçam, Mudurnu
 Vakıfaktaş, Mudurnu
 Yaylabeli, Mudurnu
 Yazılar, Mudurnu
 Yeğenderesi, Mudurnu
 Yeniceşeyhler, Mudurnu

Seben 
 Seben
 Alpagut, Seben
 Bakırlı, Seben
 Bozyer, Seben
 Çeltikdere, Seben
 Dedeler, Seben
 Değirmenkaya, Seben
 Dereboy, Seben
 Ekiciler, Seben
 Gerenözü, Seben
 Gökhaliller, Seben
 Güneyce, Seben
 Haccağız, Seben
 Hoçaş, Seben
 Kabak, Seben
 Karaağaç, Seben
 Kaşbıyıklar, Seben
 Kesenözü, Seben
 Kızık, Seben
 Korucuk, Seben
 Kozyaka, Seben
 Kuzgölcük, Seben
 Musasofular, Seben
 Nimetli, Seben
 Solaklar, Seben
 Susuz, Seben
 Tazılar, Seben
 Tepe, Seben
 Yağma, Seben
 Yuva, Seben

Yeniçağa 
 Yeniçağa
 Adaköy, Yeniçağa
 Aşağıkuldan, Yeniçağa
 Çamlık, Yeniçağa
 Akıncılar, Yeniçağa
 Dereköy, Yeniçağa
 Doğancı, Yeniçağa
 Eskiçağa, Yeniçağa
 Gölbaşı, Yeniçağa
 Hamzabey, Yeniçağa
 Kemaller, Yeniçağa
 Kındıra, Yeniçağa
 Ören, Yeniçağa
 Sarayköy, Yeniçağa
 Şahnalar, Yeniçağa
 Yamanlar, Yeniçağa
 Yukarıkuldan, Yeniçağa

References 

lists
Bolu